The 35th running of the Tour of Flanders cycling classic was held on Sunday, 1 April 1951. Italian Fiorenzo Magni won the race with a five-and-a-half minute lead over Frenchman Bernard Gauthier. It was Magni's third consecutive victory in the Tour of Flanders; the first and to date only rider to achieve this feat. 30 of 196 riders finished.

Route
The race started in Ghent and finished in Wetteren – totaling 274 km. The course featured four categorized climbs:
 Kwaremont
 Kruisberg
 Edelareberg
 Muur van Geraardsbergen

Results

Notes

References

Tour of Flanders
Tour of Flanders
Tour of Flanders
Tour of Flanders
Tour of Flanders